Gaius Memmius (? – 75 BC) was a Roman plebeian and a soldier of the Late Roman Republic.

Biography 
His father was probably Gaius Memmius Mordax, the tribune of 111 BC. He was married to Pompeia, the older sister of Gnaeus Pompeius Magnus, making him Pompey's brother-in-law. They likely had a son by the same name whom became a moneyer. He is recorded to have served Pompey during his Sicilian command in 81 BC at the end of Sulla's civil war. When Pompey sailed to Africa, to fight the remnants of the Cinna-Marian faction under Gnaeus Domitius Ahenobarbus, he put Memmius in command on Sicily. 

During the Sertorian War Memmius first served the proconsul Quintus Caecilius Metellus Pius who was given the command against the Roman rebel Quintus Sertorius on the Iberian Peninsula. He probably went with Metellus's army when Metellus marched to Iberia in 79 BC. When Pompey was sent to support Metellus against Sertorius in 76 BC, Memmius was transferred to Pompey's army and served his brother-in-law as a quaestor. Pompey sent Memmius, accompanied by the Spaniard Balbus, with a fleet to try and take New Carthage, secure it as a base, and from there move up the coast. Memmius and his force were immediately blockaded in the city, probably by Sertorius's pirate allies, and was unable to play his part in the campaign. In 75 BC at the Battle of Saguntum he was killed during the early stages of the battle when Sertorius launched an ad hominem attack at Pompey trying to decapitate the Pompeian army; Pompey survived the attack, Memmius died defending his brother-in-law. Plutarch called him 'the most capable of Pompey's lieutenants'.

Sources
Plutarch, Parallel Lives, Life of Sertorius, 11 and 19.
Plutarch, Parallel Lives, Life of Pompey, 21.

Notes and references

1st-century BC Romans
Ancient Romans killed in action
Military personnel killed in action
Pompey
Year of birth unknown